Marcus Pomponius Maecius Probus (c. 195 – after 228) was a Consul in 228 AD.

He was the son of Marcus Maecius Probus and his wife Pomponia Arria.

In the genealogical reconstruction by C. Settipani, he married and had: 
 Marcus Maecius Probus (born c. 220), married to Pupiena Sextia Paulina Cethegilla (born c. 225), daughter of Marcus Pupienus Africanus and his wife Cornelia Marullina, and had:
 (Marcus Maecius Orfitus) (born c. 245), married to (Furia) (born c. 244), daughter of Gordian III and his wife Tranquillina, and had:
 (Maecia Proba) (born c. 270), married to (Faltonius) (born c. 260), son of Faltonius Pinianus, and had issue

See also
Maecia gens

Sources
Continuité gentilice et continuité sénatoriale dans les familles sénatoriales romaines à l'époque impériale, 2000

2nd-century Romans
3rd-century Romans
Imperial Roman consuls
Year of birth uncertain
190s births
3rd-century deaths
Year of death unknown
Probus